Discus Thrower is a bronze sculpture in Washington, D.C. A copy of Myron's Discobolus, it is located in Edward J. Kelly Park, at 21st Street and Virginia Avenue, N.W. Washington, D.C. The architect was  Rodolfo Siviero, and the founder was Bruno Bearzi.

It was dedicated on March 1, 1956. It was a gift from the Italian government to commemorate the return of looted art objects after World War II.
 
The inscription reads: 
(Base of sculpture, east side:)
GLI ITALIANI
AL POPOLO AMERICANO
28 FEBBRAIO 1956 
(Base of sculpture, west side:) 
SIGNVM IVSTITIAE RESTITVTAE
XXVIII.II.MCMXLVIII

See also
 Discobolus (Harvard University)
 List of public art in Washington, D.C., Ward 2

References

External links
 

1956 establishments in Washington, D.C.
1956 sculptures
Artworks in the collection of the National Park Service
Bronze sculptures in Washington, D.C.
Foggy Bottom
Monuments and memorials in Washington, D.C.
Outdoor sculptures in Washington, D.C.
Sculptures of men in Washington, D.C.
Sculptures of sports
Statues in Washington, D.C.